Mamihan Umarov (German: Martin Beck; March 17, 1977 - July 4, 2020) was an Austrian blogger of Chechen origin, also known as Anzor from Vienna; political emigrant. He was known as an ardent opponent and critic of Ramzan Kadyrov's activities as head of the Chechen Republic in Russia. On July 4, 2020, he was shot and killed in Vienna by a Russian agent.

Life in Chechnya 
Born on March 17, 1977, in the city of Argun, Shali district, Chechen-Ingush ASSR. He had a brother and two sisters: the brother was killed by the security forces.

Between the First and the Second Chechen wars, during the recognition of the independence of Chechnya, Umarov was the investigator at the Ministry of Sharia State Security of the Chechen Republic of Ichkeria.  After the return of Chechnya under the control of the federal authorities, Umarov was arrested several times and beaten during the interrogations. This affected on his decision to move from Russia to Austria. In 2005, Umarov moved to Austria due to the threat on his life.

Emigration 
He was granted political asylum and became a citizen of Austria. Since 2008 he collaborated with the Austrian secret services. He became known among the Chechen audience as the author of a political video blog with more than 10,000 subscribers. He sharply criticized the Russian authorities and personally Ramzan Kadyrov. 30 videos had been published on the channel. The popularity of Umarov's videos ranged from 100 to 500 thousand views.

In 2020, he said that since 2017 he was cooperating with Ukrainian special services, in particular, he warned Igor Mosiychuk and Adam Osmayev about receiving the order from Chechnya to kill them. He was the main witness in the cases of the attack on Amina Okuyeva and her husband Adam Osmayev (on October 30, 2017, unknown people shot their car near Kyiv: Okuyeva was killed, Osmayev was injured) and the terrorist attack under the building of the Espresso TV channel (October 25, 2017).

He stated that the special operation to expose Russian killers, which he agreed to at the insistence of the SBU, was stopped after the coming to power of Volodymyr Zelensky and Ivan Bakanov.

Assassination 
He was shot in the back of the head in the suburbs of Vienna, near the G3 shopping center, at 7.30 pm on Saturday, July 4, 2020.

A few hours after the discovery of Umarov's body in Vienna, the police started the operation of pursuing the suspect in the murder: he was not showing any resistance during detaining. The detainee was a native of Chechnya, 48-year-old Sarali Akhtaev, who moved to Europe in 2002. Umarov’s blood was found on the soles of Akhtaev's shoes.

References 

1977 births
2020 deaths
Russian bloggers
Austrian people of Chechen descent
People from Argun, Chechen Republic
Assassinated Chechen people
People murdered in Austria